The following lists events that happened during 2000 in Croatia.

Incumbents
President: 
 until 2 February: Vlatko Pavletić (acting)
 2 February-18 February: Zlatko Tomčić (acting)
 starting 19 February: Stjepan Mesić
Prime Minister: Zlatko Mateša (until 27 January), Ivica Račan (starting 27 January)

Events

January
January 3 – The 2000 general election held, won by a centre-left coalition of Social Democratic Party of Croatia (SDP) and Croatian Social Liberal Party (HSLS)
January 24 – First round of the 2000 presidential election held. Stjepan Mesić and Dražen Budiša win 41% and 28% of votes respectively, and enter the run-off.

February
February 7 – Presidential election run-off, won by Stjepan Mesić with 56% of the vote.
February 18 – Stjepan Mesić formally inaugurated as President of Croatia.

May
May 28 – Nova TV, the first national commercial television network, begins broadcast.

Arts and literature
February 19 – Goran Karan won Dora 2000 to become Croatia's representative at the Eurovision Song Contest 2000 with the song "Kad zaspu anđeli".

Deaths
February 14 – Antun Nalis, actor
March 9 – Ivo Robić, singer
August 15 – Ena Begović, actress
October 11 – Matija Ljubek, canoeist
November 30 – Vladimir Anić, linguist
December 7 – Vlado Gotovac, poet and liberal politician (born 1930)

See also
2000 in Croatian television

References

 
Years of the 20th century in Croatia
Croatia
Croatia
2000s in Croatia